The 2015 America East Conference baseball tournament was held from May 21 through 23.  The top four regular season finishers of the league's six eligible teams met in the double-elimination tournament to be held at Edward A. LeLacheur Park in Lowell, Massachusetts, the home park of UMass Lowell.   claimed their fifth tournament championship and the Conference's automatic bid to the 2015 NCAA Division I baseball tournament.

Seeding and format
The top four finishers from the regular season were seeded one through four based on conference winning percentage only.  The teams played a double-elimination tournament.  UMass Lowell, despite hosting the event, was not eligible to participate as it transitions from Division II.  The River Hawks are expected to complete this transition and be eligible for championships in the 2017–18 academic year.

Bracket

All-Tournament Team
The following players were named to the All-Tournament Team.

Most Outstanding Player
Cameron Stone was named Tournament Most Outstanding Player.  Stone, a sophomore pitcher for Stony Brook, recorded two saves in 4.1 perfect innings of work out of the Seawolves bullpen.  He closed out all three wins for Stony Brook.

References

America East Conference Baseball Tournament
Tournament
American East Conference baseball tournament
America East Conference baseball tournament
Baseball competitions in Lowell, Massachusetts
College baseball tournaments in Massachusetts